The Tinayguk River is a  tributary of the North Fork Koyukuk River in the U.S. state of Alaska.

In 1980, the entire river was designated "wild" and added to the National Wild and Scenic Rivers System. The designation means that the Tinayguk is unpolluted, free-flowing and generally inaccessible except by trail and that its watershed is essentially primitive.

The river's name means Moose in Inupiat. In 1930, forester Robert "Bob" Marshall recommended it as an alternative to West Fork, a local name that Marshall considered over-used.

Boating
Although whitewater enthusiasts sometimes run the river in small rafts or inflatable canoes or kayaks, it is remote, hazardous, and difficult to reach. The upper reaches are rated Class III (difficult) on the International Scale of River Difficulty, while the rest of the river varies between Class II (medium) and Class III. Hazards include swift current, shallow water, sharp bends, logjams, boulders, and aufeis.

See also
List of National Wild and Scenic Rivers
List of rivers of Alaska

References

Rivers of Alaska
Rivers of Yukon–Koyukuk Census Area, Alaska
Gates of the Arctic National Park and Preserve
Wild and Scenic Rivers of the United States
Rivers of Unorganized Borough, Alaska